Livingston Independent School District (LISD) is a public school district based in Livingston, Texas, United States. LISD celebrated its 100th anniversary on April 26, 2008. In addition to Livingston, the district also serves the census-designated places of Indian Springs and West Livingston, a portion of the Big Thicket Lake Estates CDP, and a portion of the community of Blanchard.

In 2009, the school district was rated "academically acceptable" by the Texas Education Agency.

Schools
Livingston High School (grades 9-12)
Livingston Junior High School (grades 6-8)
Livingston Creekside Elementary (grades 1-5)
Pine Ridge Primary School (prekindergarten and kindergarten)
Timber Creek Elementary School (grades 1-5)
Cedar Grove Elementary School (grades 1-5)
Livingston High School Academy (for high school students at risk of dropping out)
Polk County Alternative Education Program

Closed schools
Livingston High School (Grades 9-12)

Sports championships 
High-school football:
 Livingston Dunbar (1A-PVIL) 1953
 Livingston Dunbar (1A-PVIL) 1954
 Livingston Dunbar (1A-PVIL) 1958
 Livingston Dunbar (1A-PVIL) runner-up 1959

High school basketball:
 Livingston High (all schools in one division) 1939
 Livingston Dunbar (1A-PVIL) runner-up 1952

References

External links

Livingston ISD

School districts in Polk County, Texas